Galkot is a municipality in Baglung district of Gandaki province of Nepal. It consists of several VDCs. Nearby cities include Gulmi and Pokhara. Its geographic coordinates are 28°13'24"N 83°25'29"E.

It was one of the Chaubisi rajya that existed before unification of Nepal initiated by Prithvi Narayan Shah. It is around 25 km far in the South-Western direction from the headquarter of Baglung district. Today the blacktopped road connects the headquarter to the rural areas of Galkot.

Geography
Galkot is located in the mid-region of Baglung district, which itself is located in Gandaki Province, Nepal.

The region is surrounded by:
East: Baglung Municipality
West: Burtibang
North: Myagdi District
South: Gulmi District

Geography and Climate

Demographics
The total population is 73,595 out of which 33,215 are males and 40,480 are females living in 14,367 households. The majority of the people in this region are Magars, kshetris, Brahmins and Dalits.

Economy
The majority of population depend upon agriculture and livestock for living. Besides, many people have fled abroad for employment. It is the highest remittance generating region in the country. It is also the commercial and transit hub of the headquarter and western districts. People have started to use modern and commercial farming techniques.

Education
By 2060, Galkot had 14 secondary schools, 2 Boarding Schools and 2 higher secondary schools, the oldest one being Galkot Higher Secondary School (Established: 2008 Chaitra 8 BS). The numbers have increased significantly now. However, many students go to nearby headquarter, Pokhara, Kathmandu or abroad to pursue their studies.

Administration
Galkot Municipaluty consists of 11 Wards These are as follows:

 Galkot Municipality Ward No 1 Dudilabhati
 Galkot Municipality Ward No 2 Narethanti
 Galkot Municipality Ward No 3 Hatiya
  Galkot Municipality Ward No 4 Kharuwa
 Galkot Municipality Ward No 5 Harichaur
  Galkot Municipality Ward No 6 Charaudi
  Galkot Municipality Ward No 7 Malma
 Galkot Municipality Ward No 9 Malma
 Galkot Municipality Ward No 8 Kandebaas
 Galkot Municipality Ward No 10 Pandavkhani
 Galkot Municipality Ward No 11 Righa

See also
Zones of Nepal (Former)
Baglung
Burtibang
Chaubisi rajya

References

External links
UN.org: UN map of Administrative Boundaries of Nepal

Nepal municipalities established in 2017
Populated places in Baglung District
Municipalities in Gandaki Province